The action of 4 February 1781 was a minor naval engagement that occurred on 4 February 1781 off Sombrero, Anguilla, between a British force of two ships of the line and one frigate under the command of Captain Francis Reynolds-Moreton, 3rd Baron Ducie and a Dutch frigate escorting thirty merchant ships under the command of Rear-Admiral Willem Krull, and resulted in the capture of all Dutch vessels present by the British. The battle occurred soon after a British expeditionary force under the command of Admiral George Brydges Rodney had captured the Dutch colony of Sint Eustatius during the opening stages of the Fourth Anglo-Dutch War, a conflict resulting from tensions between the Kingdom of Great Britain and the Dutch Republic over Dutch support for the American rebels during the Revolutionary War.

The Dutch had been secretly supplying the Continental forces with supplies and munitions, causing the British to declare war on them in 1780, after the United States had managed to secure Dutch recognition of them as a belligerent and allow for trade between the two countries. The war consisted mostly of a series of successful British expeditions against the Dutch colonial empire. Rodney was put in command of an expeditionary force with the aim to capture the Dutch colony of Sint Eustatius in the Caribbean. The capture proved controversial in Britain due to allegations that Rodney enriched himself at the expense of putting his expeditionary force to sea to capture other Dutch colonies. Rodney received intelligence that a convoy of thirty Dutch merchant ships, laden with sugar and coffee had left the harbour a few days ago under the protection of a Dutch frigate and made sail back towards the Dutch Republic.

A British squadron under Francis Reynolds-Moreton set sail immediately following their direction, and on 4 February, managed to catch up with the Dutch convoy and engage the lone Dutch frigate, the Mars, which proved no match for the superior British forces. After thirty minutes of being pounded with a furious cannonade from the British ships, the Dutch rear-admiral, Willem Krull, gave his dying orders for the Mars to strike her colours to the British. The convoy, helpless without their escort, were all easily captured along with their cargo, and brought back to British territory. Reynolds-Moreton would go on to see action in several more naval battles, such as the Battle of the Saintes and the Battle of the Mona Passage, and ended his career as a Member of Parliament for Lancaster from 1784 until 1785, long after the conclusion of both the American Revolutionary War and the Fourth Anglo-Dutch War.

Background

The Fourth Anglo-Dutch War was a global conflict between the Kingdom of Great Britain and the Dutch Republic. While the Dutch and the British had been allies since the Glorious Revolution, the Dutch had very much become the junior partner in the alliance. The War of the Spanish Succession had ravaged the territory of the Dutch Republic thanks to the ceaseless fighting on Dutch soil, a problem which repeated itself during the War of the Austrian Succession. The Dutch Republic engaged in no major wars since the conclusion of the War of the Austrian Succession at the treaty of Aix-la-Chapelle, and allowed their army and navy to deteriorate through lack of funding and experience. Their primary source of wealth, dominion of world trade, was slowly taken over by the British, leaving their treasury weak and their armed forces ineffective, and showed to the world their impotency and weakness in regards to global affairs. The war, occurring around the same time with the American Revolutionary War, broke out over British and Dutch disagreements on the legality and conduct of Dutch trade with Britain's enemies in that war. Although the Dutch Republic had not entered into a formal alliance with the United States and their allies, the French and the Spanish, an American ambassador (and future president) managed to establish diplomatic relations with the Dutch Republic, making it the second European country to diplomatically recognise the Continental Congress.

On the outbreak of the war, British Admiral George Rodney was ordered to lead a British expedition to capture the Dutch colony of St. Eustatius, an entrepot that operated as a major trading centre despite its relatively small size. Rodney was already in the Americas as part of his service against the American rebels, and was ordered to sail into the Caribbean, as the Dutch controlled several territories there. The island was easily and bloodlessly captured by the expeditionary force along with all the merchant ships in the harbour, as the commanding Dutch forces surrendered in the face of the overwhelming British numbers. Rodney received intelligence that a convoy of about thirty merchant ships richly laden with sugar and other commodities had, just before his arrival, sailed from the island for the Dutch Republic under the escort of a Dutch frigate of thirty-six guns. He immediately dispatched two ships of the line, along with a frigate, under the command of Captain Francis Reynolds-Moreton, 3rd Baron Ducie in pursuit of them.

Battle

The British forces sailed for a while before sighting the Dutch convoy and manoeuvring their ships to engage the lone Dutch frigate, with the intention to force her to surrender from overwhelming firepower. This force consisted of the Monarch and Panther, along with the frigate Sybil. The Monarch and its crew had already been engaged at the Battle of Ushant along with other engagements. The Panther had participated in the successful expedition against Spanish-held Havana in 1762 during the Seven Years' War, and had captured a treasure-laden Spanish galleon. The Sybil was the one warship to have never have seen action before this engagement. The combined force sighted the Dutch convoy on 4 February, not long after Rodney's capture of Sint-Eustatius. Reynolds-Moreton ordered his ships to concentrate their efforts on the Dutch frigate, which quickly became surrounded. Despite the obvious inferiority in the strength of the two forces, Krul ordered his men to run out the guns and respond to the sporadic cannon fire coming from the British ships. The Monarch sailed and anchored alongside the port side of the Mars while the Sybil sailed and anchored alongside the starboard side. The Panther sailed directly behind the Mars to rake her from behind.

The action began to grow in intensity, as at the same time the merchant ships realised what was developing and attempted to escape. The combined pounding went on for thirty minutes with furious fire coming from both sides, the Mars refusing to surrender and bravely fighting on against the overwhelming British force, trying to give his merchant ships the time to escape back to the Dutch Republic. After the battle had gone on for half an hour, Krul suffered a fatal injury and with his dying breath summoned his captain, the Count van Bijland, and ordered him to strike the colours of the ship and surrender to the British. The British came aboard to capture the vessel, and then immediately weighed anchor in the direction of the escaping merchant ships. After a brief chase, all thirty of them were bloodlessly captured. Total casualties for the British amounted to just three wounded and none killed, while the Dutch suffered seven wounded and eight killed, among them Willem Krull. With the action concluded, Reynolds-Moreton ordered his ships to sail back to Sint-Eustatius, all thirty-one prizes safely in tow. The body of Krull was safely preserved during the return voyage.

Aftermath

After a short journey, Reynolds-Moreton arrived back in the harbour of Sint-Eustatius with his prizes. The thirty merchant ships had their valuable cargo brought ashore, and appropriate prize money was distributed to the crews. The body of Willem Krul, preserved during the voyage back to Sint-Eustatius, was buried in a local cemetery with full military honors, in recognition of his valiant conduct during the action. The Mars was found to be in relatively good condition despite the intense bombardment, and sailed to Portsmouth where it was commissioned into the Royal Navy as HMS Mars under the command of John Whitmore Chetwynd. However, it had a brief career, being paid off at the Chatham Dockyards in August. The Royal Navy completed her survey there on 12 February 1782. It was sold on 25 March, 1784 for £505, having never seen active service. Reynolds-Moreton would go on to see action in several more naval battles such as the decisive British victory at Battle of the Saintes, again under the command of George Rodney, and the Battle of the Mona Passage. He ended his career as a Member of Parliament for Lancaster.

The war against the American rebels continued onwards, and after seven long years of conflict without being able to triumph over the Americans, the British decided to recognise the independence of the United States in the Treaty of Paris in 1783, bringing an end to the war. The Fourth Anglo-Dutch war, however, went far better for the British; the war continued until the British and Americans had made peace, the Dutch economy being severely impacted from the loss of a significant portion of its colonial empire and the disruption of trade from the Caribbean. The Dutch decided to make peace with the British at the same time as the Americans, with all the Dutch colonies that were captured by the British being handed back to the Dutch Republic with the exception of the colony of Negapatman in the Indian subcontinent, which was kept by the British. Thanks to the British victories over the Dutch, the Dutch agreed to give the British free trade rights in parts of the Dutch East Indies. Ultimately, the war ended disastrously for the Dutch and exposed the weakness of the political and economic foundations of the republic, setting the stage for further turmoil.

Order of battle

See also
 Fourth Anglo-Dutch War

References

Bibliography

Further reading
 

Conflicts in 1781
Naval battles of the Fourth Anglo-Dutch War
Naval battles involving Great Britain
Naval battles involving the Dutch Republic